Labaree is a surname. Notable people with the surname include:

Benjamin Labaree (1801–1883), minister, professor and the longest serving president of Middlebury College from 1840 to 1866
Benjamin Woods Labaree (1927–2021), historian of American colonial history and American maritime history
David Labaree, American historian of education
Leonard Woods Labaree (1897–1980), documentary editor, a professor of history at Yale University for over 40 years